The Ms. International female bodybuilding contest was considered to be the second-most prestigious  competition for female bodybuilders (second only to the Ms. Olympia competition), from its inception in 1986 through 2013.  It was first held in 1986 by the International Federation of BodyBuilders (IFBB.). In 1987, the IFBB allowed the Amateur Athletic Union (AAU) to sanction the Ms. International as an amateur event. In 1988, the contest was again sanctioned by the IFBB. From 1989 the contest was part of the Arnold Sports Festival.

The top all-time winners are Iris Kyle with seven titles and followed by Yaxeni Oriquen-Garcia with five titles. The only amateur to win the overall title was Kathy Segal.

In 2013, it was announced that IFBB would drop Ms. International from the 2014 IFBB Pro Schedule.

History

1986  – 1988 
The first Ms. International was held in 1986, and was sanctioned by the International Federation of BodyBuilders (I.F.B.B.). The contest was held in conjunction with the men's event, which was called the IFBB Pro World Championship. Ben Weider proclaimed that the top six finishers would qualify for IFBB pro status, and be invited to compete at the 1986 IFBB Pro World in Toronto. The 1986 and 1988 Ms. Internationals were designated as pro-am contests, and top amateurs were also invited to compete. In 1987, Ms. International was an amateur event sanctioned by the AAU. In 1988, Jim Lorimer and Arnold Schwarzenegger felt the women's competition should become a regular event along with the men's.

1989  – 1999 
Since 1989, the men's Pro World Championship was renamed the Arnold Schwarzenegger Classic and the Ms. International become part of The Arnold Classic Weekend. That same year Tonya Knight had to forfeit both her placing and prize money from the 1988 and 1989 Ms. International when it was found out that she used someone else to take her drug test at the 1989 Ms. Olympia. The first narrow victory came in 1991 when Tonya Knight topped Anja Schreiner by a score of 30 to 32. There has been some controversy at the 1992 Ms. International. Anja Schreiner and Paula Bircumshaw both had the same body height, however, Paula had much more muscle and weight (162 lbs). The judges regulated her to eighth place and the judges did not, as custom, called out the top ten competitors on stage before announcing the winners.  However this time, they only announced the top six competitors on stage in order to prevent Paula back on stage. The audience rioted over this decision and changed Paula's name. Paula did come back on stage only to give the judges the middle finger. Because of this, she was given a year's suspension. In 1996, Kim Chizevsky-Nicholls became the first to win both Ms. International and Ms. Olympia in the same year.

2000  – 2005 
The 2000 contest saw the introduction of weight classes, with a posedown between the two class winners to decide the overall championship. In 2004, Iris Kyle won her first heavyweight and overall Ms. Intentional. In 2005, Iris skipped the Ms. International, and focused defending her Olympia title, allowing Yaxeni Oriquen-Garcia to win.

2006  – 2013 
The contest reverted to the single, open-class format in 2006. In 2006 and 2007, Iris won both Ms. Internationals. In 2007, the NPC Arnold Amateur was created as part of the Arnold Classic Weekend, which contained amateur women's bodybuilding. The Arnold Amateur Ms. International, unlike Arnold Classic Ms. International, contains weight classes. From 2007 to 2010 the Arnold Amateur Ms. International contained three weight classes, lightweight, middleweight, and heavyweight. The overall winner of the Amateur Ms. International wins an IFBB pro card. In 2011, the middleweight was removed.

There was a bit of a controversy in the 2008 Ms. International. Iris was placed 7th due to "bumps" on her glutes which, according to head IFBB judge, Sandy Ranalli, were “distortions in her physique.” The second narrowest victory in Ms. International history came at the 2008 Ms. International, when Yaxeni Oriquen-Garcia edged out runner-up Dayana Cadeau by the score of 30 to 32. Iris Kyle rebounded at the 2009 Ms. International, which she won. Iris went on to win both the 2010 and 2011 Ms. International. Due to a leg injury, Iris could not compete in the 2012 Ms. International, which was won by Yaxeni Oriquen-Garcia. In 2013, Iris Kyle won back her Ms. International title.

On June 7, 2013, event promoter of the Arnold Sports Festival, Jim Lorimer, announced that in 2014, the Arnold Classic 212  professional men's bodybuilding division would replace the Ms. International women's bodybuilding competition at the 2014 Arnold Sports Festival. Lorimer, in a statement, said “The Arnold Sports Festival was proud to support women’s bodybuilding through the Ms. International for the past quarter-century, but in keeping with demands of our fans, the time has come to introduce the Arnold Classic 212 beginning in 2014. We are excited to create a professional competitive platform for some of the IFBB Pro League’s most popular competitors.”

2018 
On January 5, 2018, Beth Mandyck, a female bodybuilder, filed a sex discrimination lawsuit with the city of Columbus, Ohio over the IFBB canceling the Ms. International from the Arnold Sports Festival. She has also started a change.org petition. Her complaint has been backed by Iris Kyle, Nancy Hogshead-Makar, former Olympic gold medalist and the CEO of Champion Women, an advocacy group for women in sports, and Women's Sports Foundation.

Champions

Chronologically

Notes:

  Tonya Knight had to forfeit both her placing and prize money when it was found out she had used someone else to take her drug test at the 1988 Ms. Olympia.

Number of wins

Number of consecutive wins

Top 3

Medals by nation

See also 
 Rising Phoenix World Championships (the equivalent competition to the Ms. International from 2020 – present)
 Arnold Classic
 Arnold Sports Festival

References

External links 
Ms. International at the Arnold Classic
Professional Competition Results
Amateur Competition Results

1986 establishments in the United States
2013 disestablishments in Ohio
2013 in bodybuilding
History of female bodybuilding
Defunct sporting events
Female professional bodybuilding competitions
Sports in Columbus, Ohio